Laissez Faire Books (LFB) was an online bookseller originally based in New York City when it first opened in 1972.

From 1982 until 2007, Laissez Faire Books operated as a division of two separate non-profit corporations, the Center for Independent Thought from 1982 to 2004, and the Center for Libertarian Thought from 2005 to 2007. In November 2007, the bookstore's ownership was transferred to the International Society for Individual Liberty. In March 2011, Agora Financial acquired Laissez Faire Books, but changed its purpose.

History
Laissez Faire Books was founded in New York City in 1972 by John Muller and Sharon Presley. Muller, a civil engineer, came up with the idea of Laissez Faire Books. Muller found the location for the Laissez Faire Bookstore and Art Gallery on Mercer Street in Greenwich Village, New York City, late in 1971. With Presley, a graduate student in psychology at CUNY Graduate Center, Muller mailed their first flyer to about a thousand people whose names they had compiled from their contacts around the country. The official opening occurred on March 4, 1972 and was attended by local libertarian writers and thinkers including Murray Rothbard, Roy A. Childs Jr., and Jerome Tuccille.

From 1982 to 2005, LFB was headed by Andrea Millen Rich, who with her husband Howard Rich also developed its mail-order business.

In Radicals for Capitalism, a history of the libertarian movement, Brian Doherty writes "The store became an important social center for the movement in America's largest city, a place for any traveling libertarian to stop for company and succor..."

On March 17, 2011, Agora Financial, LLC, a publisher of books and newsletters on economics and investments, announced that it had acquired Laissez Faire Books from the International Society for Individual Liberty (ISIL). By 2017, however, the LFB.org site was no longer offering books for sale.

Laissez Faire Books' archival records ("correspondence, memoranda, financial records, catalogs, other printed matter, and photographs, relating to libertarianism and publishing in the United States") for the period 1959-2008 are stored at the Hoover Institution Library at Stanford University.

Fox & Wilkes Books
Laissez Faire Books used to have a separate book-publishing arm: Fox & Wilkes Books, named after two eighteenth-century British classical liberals, Charles James Fox and John Wilkes. Fox & Wilkes published the works of contemporary libertarian authors and reissued classic libertarian books that were out of print.

References

External links
Laissez Faire Books
Liberty article on history of LFB

Bookstores in Manhattan
Classical liberalism
Anarcho-capitalism
Libertarian organizations based in the United States
American companies established in 1972
Retail companies established in 1972
1972 establishments in New York City